The L.A. Riot Spectacular is a 2005 satire film about the 1992 Los Angeles riots. Written and directed by music video director Marc Klasfeld (in his feature film directorial debut), the film stars Snoop Dogg, Charles Dutton, Emilio Estevez and George Hamilton.

Cast
 Snoop Dogg as The Narrator
 Charles Dutton as Mayor Tom Bradley
 Emilio Estevez as Officer Powell
 George Hamilton as The King of Beverly Hills
 T. K. Carter as Rodney
 Charles Durning as The Lawyer
 Christopher McDonald as Officer Koon
 Jonathan Lipnicki as Tom Saltine Jr.
 Ted Levine as Tom Saltine
 William Forsythe as George Holliday
 Ronny Cox as Chief Daryl Gates
 Michael Buffer as himself
 Ron Jeremy as Arrestee 
 Ian Abercrombie as Auctioneer

References

External links

 

2005 films
American satirical films
2005 comedy films
2005 directorial debut films
Hood films
1992 Los Angeles riots
Films scored by Nicholas Pike
2000s English-language films
2000s American films